Yevhen Smirnov (born 16 April 1993) is a professional Ukrainian football midfielder who plays for Sfântul Gheorghe Suruceni.

Career
Smirnov is product of youth team systems of FC Chornomorets and his first trainer was Vitaliy Hotsulyak. From July 2014 he is on loan for FC Tiraspol.

Honours
Sfântul Gheorghe Suruceni
Moldovan Cup: 2020–21
Moldovan Cup: Runner-Up 2021–22

Chornomorets Odesa
Ukrainian Cup: Runner Up 2012–13

References

External links

1993 births
Living people
Ukrainian footballers
FC Chornomorets Odesa players
Ukrainian expatriate footballers
Ukrainian Premier League players
Expatriate footballers in Moldova
FC Tiraspol players
Ukrainian expatriate sportspeople in Moldova
Association football midfielders
Expatriate footballers in Belarus
Expatriate footballers in Kazakhstan
Ukrainian expatriate sportspeople in Belarus
FC Gomel players
FC Sfîntul Gheorghe players
FC Turan players
Footballers from Odesa